The 41st Manitoba Legislature was created following a general election in 2016.

The Progressive Conservative Party led by Brian Pallister formed a majority government.

The Lieutenant Governor was Janice Filmon.

Members of the 41st Legislative Assembly

Members in bold are in the Cabinet of Manitoba
† Speaker of the Assembly

Standings changes in the 41st Assembly

Source:

See also
2011 Manitoba general election
Legislative Assembly of Manitoba

References

Terms of the Manitoba Legislature
2016 establishments in Manitoba
2016 in Manitoba
2017 in Manitoba
2018 in Manitoba
2019 in Manitoba
2020 in Manitoba
2016 in Canadian politics
2017 in Canadian politics
2018 in Canadian politics
2019 in Canadian politics
2020 in Canadian politics